Nondumiso Precious Shangase (born 5 April 1996) is a South African cricketer who plays as a right-arm off break bowler. In April 2019, she was named in South Africa's squads for their series against Pakistan. She made her Women's Twenty20 International (WT20I) debut for South Africa against Pakistan on 19 May 2019.

In September 2019, she was named in the Terblanche XI squad for the inaugural edition of the Women's T20 Super League in South Africa. In the same month, she was named in South Africa's Women's One Day International (WODI) squad for their series against India. She made her WODI debut for South Africa, against India, on 9 October 2019. In January 2020, she was named in South Africa's squad for the 2020 ICC Women's T20 World Cup in Australia. On 23 July 2020, Shangase was named in South Africa's 24-woman squad to begin training in Pretoria, ahead of their tour to England.

In April 2021, she was part of the South African Emerging Women's squad that toured Bangladesh.

References

External links
 
 

1996 births
Living people
Cricketers from Durban
South African women cricketers
South Africa women One Day International cricketers
South Africa women Twenty20 International cricketers
KwaZulu-Natal Coastal women cricketers